Mark Waller (born 1969) is a former Colorado county commissioner as well as a former legislator in the U.S. state of Colorado and county level assistant district attorney. Elected to the Colorado House of Representatives as a Republican in 2008, Waller represented House District 15, which encompasses portions of northeastern Colorado Springs, Colorado. Waller also served in the US Air Force from 1993 until 2000, joining the Air Force Reserves in 2001, and following his graduation from the University of Denver Law School, he worked as an attorney prosecuting insurgents during the Iraq War; he was deployed in 2006.

Legislative career

2008 election

Mark Waller defeated incumbent Rep. Douglas Bruce in the contested Republican primary in August, taking 52 percent of votes cast.

Waller faced Democrat Leslie Maksimowicz in the November 2008 general election. Waller's candidacy was endorsed by the Denver Post and the Colorado Springs Independent,
 and he won election to the legislature with 66 percent of votes cast.

2009 legislative session
For the 2009 legislative session, Waller was named to seats on the House Education Committee and the House Judiciary Committee.

Waller sponsored legislation to require disclosure on clothes collection bins operated by for-profit companies, to include a new derivative of methamphetamine to Colorado's list of banned drugs, and to exclude dry-ice bombs from a felony list of explosives, and to allow homeschooled students to enroll in college classes.

2010 legislative session 
During the 2010 legislative session, Waller concentrated on criminal-justice related bills. A bill based on Governor Bill Ritter's criminal justice commission addressed reforming possession-related drug offenses, reducing some of the felonies and redirecting money toward treatment and recidivism reduction. Waller also worked to stop House Bill 1205, a military exclusion bill that Waller viewed as unfair in regards to private property rights; he sought to reconcile interests of both military installations and private property owners, particularly in terms of the prevalence of both within his district.

2010 election 
Waller defeated Democrat Marcus Cimino with 74.7% of the 26,229 votes cast in the 2010 Midterm Election.

2011 legislative session

2012 legislative session

2012 election
In the 2012 General Election, Representative Waller faced Libertarian challenger Larry Reedy. Waller was reelected by a margin of 73% to 15% with other third-party candidates garnering the remainder of the vote.

2013 legislative session 
Waller served as House Minority leader during the 2013 legislative session. A bipartisan effort with Democrat Pete Lee passed legislation that moved forward the state's restorative justice programs, albeit with compromises acknowledged on Waller's part.

Post-legislative career

2014 election
When John Suthers left the position to run in the 2015 Colorado Springs mayoral election, Waller declared his candidacy for Colorado Attorney General. Following a low performance in the primary on June 24, Waller withdrew from the race and endorsed Cynthia Coffman, who went on to win the November election.

2016 election
Following a defeat of his primary opponent Tim Geitner, Waller was sworn in as El Paso County Commissioner for District 2, which encompasses the eastern side of Colorado Springs and the eastern edges of El Paso County. Waller took his seat early due to his predecessor, Amy Lathen, exiting her position for another job in June 2016. Waller's four-year term began on January 11, 2017, following his win in the November 2016 General Election.

2020 election
Waller declared his candidacy for the position of District Attorney in the 4th Judicial District in June 2019. He faced Senior Deputy District Attorney Michael Allen in the GOP primary, held June 30, 2020. Both Waller and Allen secured multiple endorsements early in the contest; Waller's included El Paso County Sheriff Bill Elder, while Allen was endorsed by John Suthers Allen won the race on June 30 by around 8,000 votes. Waller's term as county commissioner ended after 2020.

References

External links
 Campaign website

1969 births
Living people
County commissioners in Colorado
Republican Party members of the Colorado House of Representatives
People from Macomb, Illinois
Politicians from Colorado Springs, Colorado
Southern Illinois University Edwardsville alumni
United States Air Force officers
University of Denver alumni
University of North Dakota alumni
21st-century American politicians
Military personnel from Illinois
Military personnel from Colorado